Stoke Hall may refer to any of the following:

 Stoke Hall, Cheshire
 Stoke Hall, Derbyshire
 Stoke Hall, Nottinghamshire
 Stoke Hall, Ipswich